1986 Football Championship of Ukrainian SSR was the 56th season of association football competition of the Ukrainian SSR, which was part of the Soviet Second League in Zone 6. The season started on 28 March 1986 with the game Sudobudivnyk Mykolaiv – Nyva Ternopil.

The 1986 Football Championship of Ukrainian SSR was won by FC Zorya Luhansk. Qualified for the interzonal playoffs, the team from Luhansk Oblast managed to gain promotion by winning its group.

The "Ruby Cup" of Molod Ukrayiny newspaper (for the most scored goals) was received by SC Tavriya Simferopol.

Format 
The season consisted of two stages preliminary and final tournaments. During the preliminary tournament participants were split into two groups of 14 teams in each with the seven best of each group qualifying for the championship group of the next stage and the seven worst played a consolation tournament.

In the final stage of both championship and consolation tournaments teams played home and away only with teams of another group. The winner of championship tournament further participated in the Soviet Second League interzonal playoffs in an effort to gain promotion to the First League, while the worst team of consolation tournament relegated to amateurs.

Teams

Promoted teams 
 Naftovyk Okhtyrka – Champion of the Fitness clubs competitions (KFK) (debut)

Relegated teams 
 None

Renamed teams 
 FC Shakhtar Pavlohrad used to be known as Kolos Mezhyrich and located in one of the city of Pavlohrad's suburbs.

Preliminary stage

Group 1

Location map

Final standings

Group 2

Location map

Final standings

Final stage

Championship tournament

Final standings

Consolation tournament

Final standings

Top goalscorers 
The following were the top ten goalscorers.

See also 
 Soviet Second League

External links 
 1986 Soviet Second League, Zone 6 (Ukrainian SSR football championship). Luhansk football portal
 1986 Soviet championships (all leagues) at helmsoccer.narod.ru

1986
3
Soviet
Soviet
football
Football Championship of the Ukrainian SSR